Real Live is a live album by American singer-songwriter Bob Dylan, released on November 29, 1984 by Columbia Records. Recorded during the artist's 1984 European Tour, most of the album was recorded at Wembley Stadium on 7 July, but "License to Kill" and "Tombstone Blues" come from St James' Park, Newcastle on 5 July, and "I and I" and "Girl from the North Country" were recorded at Slane Castle, Ireland on 8 July.

Background 
Produced by Glyn Johns, it features Mick Taylor (formerly of the Rolling Stones) on lead guitar, Ian McLagan (formerly of the Faces) on keyboards, and a guest appearance from Carlos Santana. The performances on Real Live were recorded in support of his successful Infidels album.

Reception 
While Infidels was hailed as a "return to musical form" (as described by Kurt Loder in Rolling Stone magazine), critical reception for Real Live was generally mixed.

In his review for Rolling Stone, Kurt Loder, rating the album 3/5, wrote, "Although cynics may find that Dylan's trademark wheeze is verging on self-parody by this point, his singing is truly spirited throughout. The band he assembled for the tour generally serves him well, if without inspiration...some fans may get a giggle out of the rhythm riff – lifted from Ray Charles' 'I Believe to My Soul' – that graces 'Ballad of a Thin Man'. But 'Highway 61 Revisited' is well done as a rocker and 'Tombstone Blues' with Carlos Santana rolls along with great energy."

In Bob Dylan: The Complete Album Guide, Rolling Stone panned Real Live but recognized the album's heavily-revised version of "Tangled Up in Blue" as a "Forgotten Classic". The feature quoted Dylan as stating: "On Real Live, ['Tangled Up in Blue']'s more like it should have been. The imagery is better".

NJ Arts's Jay Lustig cited "I and I" as the standout track from the album and praised Mick Taylor's "stellar guitar work" on it.

Track listing

Personnel
Bob Dylan – guitar, harmonica, keyboards, vocals

Additional musicians
Colin Allen – drums
Ian McLagan – keyboards
Carlos Santana – guitar on "Tombstone Blues"
Gregg Sutton – bass guitar
Mick Taylor – guitar

Production
Glyn Johns – producer
Guido Harari - cover photograph

References

1984 live albums
Albums produced by Glyn Johns
Bob Dylan live albums
Columbia Records live albums
Live albums recorded at Wembley Stadium
Live hard rock albums